Martin Christopher James Maiden  is an English microbiologist. He is Professor of Molecular Epidemiology in the Department of Zoology at the University of Oxford, where he is also a fellow of Hertford College. He was elected a Fellow of the Royal College of Pathologists in 2010, a Fellow of the Society of Biology in 2012, and a Fellow of the Academy of Medical Sciences and the American Academy of Microbiology, both in 2016.

He is widely known as a developer of method of molecular typing of bacteria MLST.

References

External links

English microbiologists
Living people
Fellows of Hertford College, Oxford
Alumni of the University of Reading
Fellows of the Academy of Medical Sciences (United Kingdom)
Fellows of the Royal College of Pathologists
Fellows of The Society of Biology
Year of birth missing (living people)